
Year 75 BC was a year of the pre-Julian Roman calendar. At the time it was known as the Year of the Consulship of Octavius and Cotta (or, less frequently, year 679 Ab urbe condita). The denomination 75 BC for this year has been used since the early medieval period, when the Anno Domini calendar era became the prevalent method in Europe for naming years.

Events 
 By place 

 Roman Republic 
 In Rome, the tribune Quintus Opimius speaks out against Sullan restrictions on the tribunate, in orations noted for sarcasm against conservatives.
 Cicero is quaestor in Western Sicily.
 Nicomedes IV of Bithynia bequeaths his kingdom to Rome on his death (75/4 BC).   Angered by the arrangement, Mithridates VI of Pontus declares war on Rome and invades Bithynia, Cappadocia and Paphlagonia, thus starting the Third Mithridatic War.
 Third Mithridatic War: M. Aurelius Cotta is defeated by Mithridates in the Battle of Chalcedon.

 Greece 
 Julius Caesar travels to Rhodes to study under Apollonius Molon. On his way across the Aegean Sea, he is kidnapped by Cilician pirates and held prisoner in the Dodecanese islet of Pharmacusa. The young Caesar is held for a ransom of twenty talents, but he insists they ask for fifty. After his release Caesar raises a fleet at Miletus, pursues and crucifies the pirates in Pergamon.

 By topic 

 Literature 
 Start of Golden Age of Latin Literature.

Births 
 Calpurnia, Roman noblewoman and wife of Julius Caesar
 Gaius Asinius Pollio, Roman politician and poet (d. AD 4) 
 Yuan of Han, Chinese emperor of the Han Dynasty (d. 33 BC)

Deaths

References